Soo-young, also spelled Su-yeong or Su-young, is a Korean given name, that is a unisex name. Its meaning depends on the hanja used to write each syllable of the name. There are 67 hanja with the reading "soo" and 34 hanja with the reading "young" on the South Korean government's official list of hanja which may be registered for use in given names.

People
People with this name include:

Entertainers
 Sooyoung Park (born 1967), American male singer-songwriter
 Lee Soo-young (born Lee Jee-yeon, 1979), South Korean female singer
 Ryu Soo-young (born Eoh Nam-seon 1979), South Korean actor
 Shoo (singer) (born Yoo Soo-young, 1981), South Korean female singer, member of girl group S.E.S.
 Choi Soo-young (born 1990), South Korean female singer, better known as Sooyoung, member of girl group Girls' Generation
 Park Soo-ah (born Park Soo-young, 1992), South Korean female singer, member of girl group After School
 Joy (singer) (born Park Soo-young, 1996), South Korean female singer, member of girl group Red Velvet

Others
 Kim Soo-young (1921–1968), South Korean male poet
 Jung Su-young (born 1985), South Korean male handball player
 Jang Soo-young (born 1988), South Korean female badminton player

Fictional characters
Fictional characters with this name include:
Soo-young, male character in 2001 South Korean television series Mina
Han Soo-young, female character in 2000s South Korean manhwa series Love Story
Kim Soo-young, male character in 2013 South Korean television series All About My Romance
No Soo-young, female character in 2013 South Korean television series Potato Star 2013QR3

See also
List of Korean given names

References

Korean unisex given names